The Troubadour Reunion Tour was a 2010 international concert tour by Carole King and James Taylor. It celebrated the 40th anniversary of their first performance together at The Troubadour in November 1970, and was a continuation of their reunion at the Troubadour in November 2007.

History
The tour was announced on November 12, 2009. Over 50 dates were scheduled in Australia and New Zealand, Japan, and North America. The tour began on March 26, 2010 at the Rod Laver Arena in Melbourne, Australia.

The touring band included the original support band from The Troubadour: Danny Kortchmar (guitar), Leland Sklar (bass) and Russ Kunkel (drums). Other members were Robbie Kondor (keyboards, piano, organ, accordion, chromatic harmonica), Arnold McCuller (vocals), Kate Markowitz (vocals) and Andrea Zonn (vocals and fiddle).

For secondary ticket sales, for the week of January 24, 2010, it was estimated to be the best selling ticket event in the world, beating out even the Super Bowl. These ticket sales were based on sales from the TicketNetwork Exchange, the largest secondary ticket exchange in the world. This does not include primary ticket sellers such as Ticketmaster.

The North America leg of the tour incorporated a stage design that included intimate nightclub-style seating. The proceeds from these seats benefit various charities.

The Oceania leg of the tour was promoted by Michael Coppel, who was also promoting Lady Gaga's The Monster Ball Tour at the same time. Lady Gaga attended one of the Troubadour Reunion concerts in Sydney.

The final performance of the tour was on July 20, 2010 at the Honda Center in Anaheim, California. In an interview with Carole King and James Taylor for Billboard Magazine, Taylor stated there will probably never be another Troubadour Reunion Tour. However, he mentioned that a European tour was possible.

Tour dates

Box office score data

Set list
One typical set list for the tour has been:

First set
"Blossom"
"So Far Away"
"Machine Gun Kelly" 
"Carolina in My Mind"
"Sunshine Sunshine"
"Smackwater Jack"
"Country Road"
"Where You Lead"
"Your Smiling Face"
"Song of Long Ago" →
"Long Ago and Far Away"
"Beautiful"
"Shower the People" 
"Way Over Yonder"

Second set
"Copperline"
"Crying in the Rain"
"Mexico"
"Sweet Baby James"
"Jazzman"
"Will You Love Me Tomorrow"
"Steamroller Blues" 
"It's Too Late"
"Fire and Rain"
"I Feel the Earth Move"
"You've Got a Friend"
Encore
"Up on the Roof"
"How Sweet It Is (To Be Loved by You)"
"You Can Close Your Eyes"
"The Loco-Motion"

Other songs played included "Honey Don't Leave L.A.", "Sweet Seasons", and "(You Make Me Feel Like) A Natural Woman" (as the first-set closer). The second or third song of the second set was a "fan request" slot, taken from a web poll for that show from a constrained list and alternating between King and Taylor. 
Notes 
While in the beginning of the tour (until May 18, 2010) “The Loco-Motion" was the final song, in later concerts (starting on May 19, 2010) the final song was "You Can Close Your Eyes" and "The Loco-Motion" was not played except for a one off return on June 23. 
Until May 30, 2010 Blossom opened all shows but then starting June 2, 2010 Blossom & Something in the way she Moves alternated the opening slot - Something in the way she Moves opened the final stretch of the tour.

Second Set Requests 
(Typicially played right after Crying in the Rain, sometimes displacing Mexico)
 For the show in Yokohama, the second show at the Hollywood Bowl, the show in Columbus: Chains.
 For the show in St. Paul, the first night in Boston Your Smiling Face

References

2010 concert tours
Reunion concert tours
James Taylor
Carole King